The 2010 United States Senate election in North Carolina was held on November 2, 2010. The filing deadline for the primaries was February 26; the primaries were held on May 4, with a Democratic primary runoff held on June 22. Incumbent Republican U.S. Senator Richard Burr won re-election to a second term. Burr is the first incumbent to win re-election for this seat since Sam Ervin's last re-election in 1968.  Burr's 54.8% also represented the highest vote share a North Carolina Republican received since the state began directly electing its senators.

Background 

This Senate seat was unfavorable to incumbents over the past several decades. No person elected to this seat was re-elected since Sam Ervin in 1968. His successor, Democrat Robert Burren Morgan, was defeated for re-election in 1980, along with many other incumbents from his party. His Republican successor, John Porter East, committed suicide in 1986. East's appointed successor, Jim Broyhill, served for just four months, resigning upon his November 1986 election loss to former Democratic Governor Terry Sanford. In 1992, the seat changed hands yet again, as Sanford was defeated by wealthy GOP businessman Lauch Faircloth, who himself lost in his bid for a second term six years later by John Edwards. In 2004, no incumbent was defeated, as Edwards was running for vice president and was not allowed to be on the ballot in both races. However, that year the seat did change parties for the fifth time in a row, with Richard Burr defeating Bill Clinton's onetime Chief of Staff Erskine Bowles.

Democratic primary

Candidates 
From the North Carolina State Board of Elections:

 Elaine Marshall, North Carolina Secretary of State and candidate in 2002
 Cal Cunningham, former State Senator
 Susan Harris, retired accountant
 Ken Lewis, attorney
 Marcus Williams, attorney
 Ann Worthy, former Gaston County Board of Education member

Polling

Results 

* Note: Since no candidate received 40% of the vote on May 4, state law allowed a runoff (or "second primary") election if requested by the second-place finisher. Cunningham requested such a runoff.

Republican primary

Candidates 
 Richard Burr, incumbent U.S. Senator
 Eddie Burks, Asheboro City Councilman
 Brad Jones, businessman
 Larry Linney, former State Representative

Polling

Results

General election

Candidates 
 Michael Beitler (L), lecturer of Bryan School of Business and Economics at the University of North Carolina at Greensboro
 Richard Burr (R), incumbent U.S. Senator
 Elaine Marshall (D), North Carolina Secretary of State

Campaign 
Marshall was endorsed by The Charlotte Observer, The Wilmington Star-News, the Elizabeth City Daily Advance and The Southern Pines Pilot. Burr was endorsed by Greensboro News & Record, and the Asheville Citizen-Times.

Debates 
 October 11: Sponsored by the North Carolina Association of Broadcasters Education Foundation and moderated by the Carl Kasell. It was televised by UNC-TV in Raleigh.
 October 14: In Raleigh
 October 21: Sponsored by N.C. Association of Broadcasters and was moderated by Judy Woodruff in Durham.

Predictions

Polling

Fundraising

Results

See also 
 2010 North Carolina elections
 2010 United States House of Representatives elections in North Carolina

References

External links 
 North Carolina State Board of Elections
 U.S. Congress candidates for North Carolina at Project Vote Smart
 North Carolina U.S. Senate 2010 from OurCampaigns.com
 Campaign contributions from Open Secrets
 2010 North Carolina Senate General Election: All Head-to-Head Matchups graph of multiple polls from Pollster.com
 Election 2010: North Carolina Senate from Rasmussen Reports
 2010 North Carolina Senate Race from Real Clear Politics
 2010 North Carolina Senate Race from CQ Politics
 Race profile from The New York Times
Debates
 North Carolina Democratic Senate Primary Runoff Debate, C-SPAN, June 15, 2010
Official campaign sites (Archived)
 Elaine Marshall for U.S. Senate
 Mike Beitler for U.S. Senate
 Richard Burr for U.S. Senate incumbent

North Carolina
2010
United States Senate